Phnom Dei  is a khum (commune) of Phnom Srok District in Banteay Meanchey Province in western Cambodia.

Villages
Source:

 Phnom Dei
 Ponley
 Kouk Seh
 Thnal Dach
 Bos Sbov
 Trapeang Prei
 Kamping Puoy
 Spean Kmeng
 Trang

References

Communes of Banteay Meanchey province
Phnom Srok District